The 1992 Masters (officially the 1992 Benson & Hedges Masters) was a professional non-ranking snooker tournament that took place between 2 and 9 February 1992 at the Wembley Conference Centre in London, England.

Stephen Hendry retained his title by beating John Parrott 9–4 in the final. This was Parrott's last of his three masters finals, he would retire without winning the event.

Field
Defending champion Stephen Hendry was the number 1 seed. Places were allocated to the top 16 players in the world rankings. Players seeded 15 and 16 played in the wild-card round against the winner of the qualifying event, Ken Doherty (ranked 51), and James Wattana (ranked 20), who was the wild-card selection. Ken Doherty and Tony Jones were making their debuts in the Masters.

Wild-card round
In the preliminary round, the wild-card players plays the 15th and 16th seeds:

Main draw

Final

Qualifying
Ken Doherty won the qualifying tournament, known as the 1991 Benson & Hedges Championship at the time.

Century breaks
Total: 8

 139  Jimmy White
 136, 118  Stephen Hendry
 130, 105  James Wattana
 119  Gary Wilkinson
 114  John Parrott
 101  Steve Davis

James Wattana's 130 was scored in the wild-card round.

References 

Masters (snooker)
Masters
Masters (snooker)
Masters (snooker)
Masters (snooker)